Saralanj (also Romanized as Saralandzh and Saralandj; formerly, Tulnabi) is a village in the Kotayk Province of Armenia. The mayor of Saralanj is Gegham Zilifyan.

See also 
Kotayk Province

References 

Populated places in Kotayk Province